The Dorothy and Lillian Gish Prize or Gish Prize is given annually to "a man or woman who has made an outstanding contribution to the beauty of the world and to mankind's enjoyment and understanding of life." It is among the most prestigious and one of the richest prizes in the American arts. The 2019 winner Walter Hood received $250,000. The founders Dorothy Gish (1898–1968) and Lillian Gish (1893–1993) were sisters, famous as actresses from the silent era of film and mid-century theatre. About the prize, established in Lillian Gish's will, she said: "It is my desire, by establishing this prize, to give recipients of the prize the recognition they deserve, to bring attention to their contributions to society and encourage others to follow in their path." It was established in 1994 by the Dorothy and Lillian Gish Prize Trust and is administered by JPMorgan Chase Bank.

Recipients
Source:

1994: Frank Gehry, architect
1995: Ingmar Bergman, film director
1996: Robert Wilson, artist and director
1997: Bob Dylan, singer, songwriter
1998: Isabel Allende, author 
1999: Arthur Miller, author and playwright
2000: Merce Cunningham, dancer and choreographer
2001: Jennifer Tipton, lighting designer
2002: Lloyd Richards, theater director
2003: Bill T. Jones, dancer and choreographer
2004: Ornette Coleman, jazz innovator
2005: Peter Sellars, theater, opera and festival director
2006: Shirin Neshat, filmmaker
2007: Laurie Anderson, artist
2008: Robert Redford, actor
2009: Pete Seeger, musician
2010: Chinua Achebe, writer
2011: Trisha Brown, dancer, choreographer and artistic director
2012: Anna Deavere Smith, author, actor, educator
2013:  Spike Lee, director, producer, writer, teacher
2014: Maya Lin, artist, architect
2015: Suzan-Lori Parks, playwright, screenwriter
2016: Elizabeth LeCompte, theater director 
2017: Meredith Monk, composer, singer, director, choreographer 
2018: Gustavo Dudamel, violinist, conductor, music director 
2019: Walter Hood, artist, designer, urbanist 
2020: Ava DuVernay, filmmaker
2021: Sonia Sanchez, poet
2022: Jawole Willa Jo Zollar, dancer and choreographer

Notes

External links
The Dorothy and Lillian Gish Prize, official website.

Awards established in 1994
Arts awards in the United States
Literary awards honoring writers
Lillian Gish
1994 establishments in the United States